Timo Saari (born 14 January 1949) is a Finnish ice hockey player. He competed in the men's tournament at the 1976 Winter Olympics.

References

1949 births
Living people
Olympic ice hockey players of Finland
Ice hockey players at the 1976 Winter Olympics
Ice hockey people from Tampere